GNU Parted (the name being the conjunction of the two words PARTition and EDitor) is a free partition editor, used for creating and deleting partitions. This is useful for creating space for new operating systems, reorganising hard disk usage, copying data between hard disks, and disk imaging. It was written by Andrew Clausen and Lennert Buytenhek.

It consists of a library, libparted, and a command-line front-end, parted, that also serves as a reference implementation.

, GNU Parted runs only under Linux and GNU/Hurd.

Other front-ends

nparted is the newt-based frontend to GNU Parted.

Projects have started for an ncurses frontend, that also could be used in Windows (with GNUWin32 Ncurses).

fatresize offers a command-line interface for FAT16/FAT32 non-destructive resize and uses the GNU Parted library.

Graphical front-ends
GParted and KDE Partition Manager are graphical programs using the parted libraries. They are adapted for GNOME and KDE respectively; two major desktop environments for Unix-like installations. They are often included as utilities on many live CD distributions to make partitioning easier. QtParted was another graphical front-end based on Qt that is no longer being actively maintained.

Pyparted (also called python-parted) is the Python front-end for GNU Parted.

Linux distributions that come with this application by default include Slackware, Knoppix, sidux, SystemRescueCD, and Parted Magic.

Limitations
Parted previously had support for operating on filesystems within partitions (creating, moving, resizing, copying). This support was removed in version 3.0.

See also

List of disk partitioning software
util-linux:
fdisk
cfdisk
sfdisk
gpart
gparted
FIPS
Master Boot Record manager

References

External links

Free partitioning software
Parted
Software using the GPL license